The Boaster is a 50-minute, 1926 American silent comedy film directed by Duke Worne and starring Ashton Dearholt, Gloria Grey and Joseph W. Girard.

Synopsis
Angered by his son Dick's boastful ways, which in one incident lead him to lose a business deal, an automobile manufacturer challenges him to complete four difficult missions.

Main cast
 Ashton Dearholt as Dick Benton
 Gloria Grey as Dick's intended 
 Joseph W. Girard as Mr. Benton

References

Bibliography
 Munden, Kenneth White. The American Film Institute Catalog of Motion Pictures Produced in the United States, Part 1. University of California Press, 1997.

External links
 

1926 films
1926 comedy films
1920s English-language films
American silent feature films
Silent American comedy films
Films directed by Duke Worne
1920s American films